Brian Kevin Fisher (born March 18, 1962) is a retired Major League Baseball pitcher. He played during seven seasons at the major league level for the New York Yankees, Pittsburgh Pirates, Houston Astros, and Seattle Mariners. He was drafted by the Atlanta Braves in the 2nd round of the 1980 amateur draft. Fisher played his first professional season with their Rookie league Gulf Coast Braves in 1980, and his last season with the San Francisco Giants' Triple-A Phoenix Firebirds in 1993. He now lives in Aurora, Colorado, with his wife and two children.

High school career 
Fisher attended William C. Hinkley High School in Aurora, Colorado. He helped Hinkley win the big-school state title in 1979.

College career 
Fisher attended Columbia College and the University of Denver.

Professional career

Minor leagues 
Fisher pitched for the Denver Zephyrs in the minor leagues in 1991.

Personal life 
In 1997, Fisher's six-year-old son Kyle lost a battle with cerebral palsy.

References

External links

1962 births
Living people
New York Yankees players
Pittsburgh Pirates players
Houston Astros players
Seattle Mariners players
Nashville Sounds players
Richmond Braves players
Major League Baseball pitchers
Baseball players from Hawaii
Anderson Braves players
Buffalo Bisons (minor league) players
Calgary Cannons players
Columbus Clippers players
Denver Zephyrs players
Durham Bulls players
Gulf Coast Braves players
Phoenix Firebirds players
Savannah Braves players
Tucson Toros players